Diyar Rabi'a is the medieval Arabic name of the easternmost and largest of the three provinces of the Jazira (Upper Mesopotamia), the other two being Diyar Bakr and Diyar Mudar. According to the medieval geographer al-Baladhuri, all three provinces were named after the main Arab tribes that were settled there by Mu'awiyah in the course of the Muslim conquests of the 7th century. The Diyar Rabi'a was settled by the Rabi'a tribe.

Diyar Rabi'a encompasses the upper reaches of the river Khabur and its tributaries, i.e. the regions of Tur Abdin and Beth Arabaye, as well as both shores of the river Tigris from the vicinity of Jazirat ibn Umar in the north to the boundary with Iraq in the area of Tikrit in the south, including the lower reaches of the Upper Zab and Lower Zab. The main city of the province was Mosul (Arabic al-Mawsil), with other important urban centres at Balad, Jazirat ibn Umar, al-Sinn, Barqa'id, Sinjar, Nasibin, Mardin and  Ra's al-'Ayn. The region was plagued by the raids of the Qarmatians in the Umayyad and Abbasid periods. In the mid-10th century, it came under the control of the native Hamdanid dynasty, centred at Mosul. The Hamdanid emirate was terminated by the Buyids in 980, and the province passed under the control of the Uqaylids, who held it until the Seljuq conquest in the late 11th century.

Sources

Medieval Upper Mesopotamia
Historical regions